Michael Strachan (born August 13, 1997) is a Bahamian gridiron football wide receiver for the Indianapolis Colts of the National Football League (NFL). He is one of only 4 football players born in the Bahamas to have played in the NFL. He was a wide receiver and track athlete in college at Charleston before being selected by the Colts in the seventh round of the 2021 NFL Draft.

Early life and high school
Strachan grew up in Freeport, Bahamas before moving to Lynchburg, Virginia, where he attended Liberty Christian Academy.

College career
Strachan was a member of the Charleston Golden Eagles for four seasons. Strachan redshirted his true freshman year and played sparingly the following season, catching one pass. As a redshirt sophomore, Strachan set a school record with 1,007 receiving yards along with eight touchdowns on 48 receptions and was named first-team All-Mountain East Conference (MEC). Strachan was again named first-team All-MEC after catching 78 passes for 1,319 yards and 19 touchdowns, all new school records, during his redshirt junior season. He opted to forgo his final season, which was postponed until spring due to the COVID-19 pandemic, to declare for the 2021 NFL draft.

Strachan also was a member of Charleston's track & field team and won conference championships in the 200 meters, 400 meters, and the 4x400 meter relay and holds the school record for the 400 meter dash.

Professional career

Strachan was selected in the seventh round with the 229th overall pick of the 2021 NFL Draft by the Indianapolis Colts. On May 6, 2021, Strachan officially signed with the Colts.

References

External links
Charleston Golden Eagles bio

Living people
Indianapolis Colts players
People from Freeport, Bahamas
Bahamian players of American football
American football wide receivers
Players of American football from Virginia
Sportspeople from Lynchburg, Virginia
Charleston Golden Eagles football players
1997 births